Pur is a village in the Bawani Khera tehsil of Bhiwani district in the Indian state of Haryana.

Demographics
, the village had 1,248 households with a total population of 6,961 of which 3,682 were male and 3,279 female.

Temples
 Sri Hanuman Mandir
 Sri Ram Mandir
 Sri Goga Ji Maharaj Mandir
 Shiv Mandir
 Paramhans Baba Harihar Mandir
 Durga Mata Mandir
 Baba Lal mandir
 guru ravidas mandir
*bhya duj mandir
 Saiyad baba mazar
 Baba Bhairav Mandir (Dera)

References

Villages in Bhiwani district